Puao (in Spanish, Poago) is a parish of the municipality of Gijón, in Asturias, Spain.

The population of Fresno was 243 in 2003 and 225 in 2012.

Fresno is one of the smallest districts of Gijón / Xixón. It borders the municipality of Carreño in the west, and with the districts of Fresno and Tremañes in the south.

Villages and their neighbourhoods

Muniello
Pavierna
Zarracina
Cimavilla
El Pozón

References

External links
 Official Toponyms - Principality of Asturias website.
 Official Toponyms: Laws - BOPA Nº 229 - Martes, 3 de octubre de 2006 & DECRETO 105/2006, de 20 de septiembre, por el que se determinan los topónimos oficiales del concejo de Gijón.

Parishes in Gijón